Rodrigo Branco Araújo (born 14 July 1991) is a Brazilian footballer.

Playing career
Branco failed a trial with Premier League club Blackburn Rovers in 2010, before leaving his native Brazil to sign with Micky Mellon's Fleetwood Town, in England's League Two. He scored six goals in eight games on loan at Northern Premier League side Lancaster City. He made his Fleetwood debut on 20 November 2012, in a 3–1 defeat to Accrington Stanley at Highbury, after replacing Curtis Obeng on 63 minutes.

Floriana
On 27 January 2013, Branco signed for Maltese Premier League side Floriana. He made just one appearance for the club, a 3–0 defeat at home to Hibernians.

Hastings United
On 4 October 2013, Branco signed for Isthmian League Division One South side Hastings United. He came off the bench in the club's 3–2 FA Trophy victory, scoring on his debut.

Horsham
On 30 November 2013, Branco moved to divisional rivals Horsham.

Knoxville Force
In 2015, Branco played for Knoxville Force.

Bangor City
In August 2016 he joined Welsh Premier League side Bangor City.

Statistics

References

External links

Living people
Brazilian footballers
Association football forwards
Brazilian expatriate footballers
Expatriate footballers in England
Fleetwood Town F.C. players
Lancaster City F.C. players
Northern Premier League players
English Football League players
1991 births
Bangor City F.C. players
Horsham F.C. players
Hastings United F.C. players
Floriana F.C. players
Expatriate footballers in Malta
Cymru Premier players